Instone is a surname. Notable people with the surname include:

Alice Instone (born 1975), British artist
Sam Instone (born 1977), British businessman
Samuel Instone (1878–1937), British shipping and aviation entrepreneur 

English-language surnames